SS Lombardia was one of a pair of transatlantic steam ocean liners that were launched in 1914 in Germany for the Hamburg America Line (HAPAG), sold to a Dutch shipping line in 1916, and seized by the United States as World War I reparations in 1922. United American Lines (UAL) operated her until 1926, when HAPAG bought her back.

Lombardia was launched as William O'Swald. Her Dutch operator renamed her Brabantia, while UAL renamed her Resolute.

In 1935 Flotte Riuniti Cosulich-Lloyd Sabaudo bought Resolute from HAPAG, renamed her Lombardia and had her converted into a troop ship. In 1936 she passed to Lloyd Triestino.

In 1943 an Allied air attack sank Lombardia in the Mediterranean. In 1946 her wreck was raised and scrapped.

Building
AG Weser built the ship in Bremen. Margarete O'Swald launched her on 30 March 1914, naming her after her father William O'Swald (1832–1923), a former Mayor of Hamburg. After the First World War began in July 1914, work to complete the ship was paused.

In the First World War the Imperial German Navy sank numerous neutral Dutch ships in error, including two passenger liners and numerous cargo ships. Koninklijke Rotterdamsche Lloyd (KRL) lost four cargo ships: Palembang and Kediri in 1916 and Bandoeng and Jacarta in 1917. The German government persuaded HAPAG to sell William O'Swald to KRL. Delivery was deferred until after the war.

The ship had three funnels and two masts. As built, she had capacity for 1,965 passengers: 355 first class, 284 second class, 469 third class and 850 steerage.

The ship had three screws. A pair of four-cylinder triple-expansion steam engines drove her port and starboard screws. Exhaust steam from their low-pressure cylinders powered a low-pressure steam turbine that drove her middle screw.

KRL service
On 28 July 1920 William O'Swald was delivered to KRL. Her new owner changed her name to Brabantia, after the Dutch province of North Brabant. On 1 September 1920 she began her maiden voyage from Amsterdam to Buenos Aires.

On the route she joined her sister ship Johann Heinrich Burchard, which had been sold to another Dutch shipping line, Koninklijke Rotterdamsche Lloyd, and renamed Limburgia. At the time, the two ships were the largest on the route between Europe and the River Plate.

UAL service
One source states that the Allied Reparations Committee awarded Limburgia and Brabantia to the United States. Another states that W. Averell Harriman's United American Lines (UAL) bought the two ships from KHL and KRL.

Either way, KHL and KRL handed Limburgia and Brabantia to UAL on 4 January 1922. UAL renamed Limburgia as Reliance, had Blohm & Voss in Hamburg refit her as a three-class ship. Her passenger capacity was reduced to 1,010 berths: 290 first class, 320 second class and 400 third class.

UAL put Resolute into scheduled service between Hamburg and New York. Initially UAL registered Reliance in the USA, but in 1923 she was re-registered in Panama to circumvent prohibition in the United States.

In 1924 Resolute made her first round-the-world cruise. It started from New York on 19 January, and ended there on 24 May.

HAPAG service
UAL had a business relationship with HAPAG. On 6 August 1926 HAPAG took over UAL, and with it former HAPAG liners including Resolute. On 10 August she left Hamburg for New York on her first voyage with her new owner. In 1927 she began her first HAPAG cruise, and from 1934 HAPAG used her for cruising full-time. HAPAG had her hull repainted white to suit her cruising role.

Her German code letters were RFVL until 1933–34, when they were superseded by the call sign DHTY. Also by 1934 her navigation equipment included a gyrocompass.

Italian service
In 1935 Flotte Riuniti Cosulich-Lloyd Sabaudo bought Resolute, renamed her Lombardia after the Italian province of Lombardy, and had her refitted as a troop ship for use in the Italian invasion of Abyssinia. In 1936 Lombardia passed to Lloyd Triestino.

On 4 August 1943 Lombardia was in Naples when an Allied air raid set her on fire and sank her. Her wreck was raised in 1946, towed to La Spezia, and scrapped.

References

Bibliography

1914 ships
Maritime incidents in 1943
Ocean liners
Passenger ships of Germany
Passenger ships of the Netherlands
Passenger ships of Panama
Ships built in Bremen (state)
Ships sunk by aircraft
Steamships of Germany
Steamships of the Netherlands
Steamships of Panama